Broken jaw may refer to:
Mandibular fracture, a medical condition where the jawbone breaks from trauma
Broken Jaw (song), a song by Foster the People
The Broken Jaw, a film by Chris Shepherd